Partizan 1–6 Hajduk Split was a football match between Partizan Belgrade and Hajduk Split on 9 May 1976 at the JNA Stadium in Belgrade, Yugoslavia. It was the 27th round of the 1975–76 Yugoslav First League. Partizan was 1st in the league with 3 points ahead of the league holders Hajduk Split. With everybody expecting Partizan to defeat Hajduk, one of the biggest surprises in Yugoslav football happened and Hajduk managed to crush them 6-1 on away ground. The game itself represents the Hajduk Split golden generation of the 1970s and was the ultimate realization of "total football" that Tomislav Ivić forced during that time.

Background

Hajduk Split was the favourite for winning the league in 1976 after winning it the 2 previous times in 1974 and 1975. Their football which was guided under coach Tomislav Ivić was considered to be revolutionary in Yugoslavia at the time. Players like Ivica Šurjak, Slaviša Žungul, Jurica Jerković, Branko Oblak and Dražen Mužinić were all considered to be world class players in Yugoslavia.

After the first part of the season in which Hajduk underperformed and lost vital points, they managed to recuperate in the 2nd part and gain form just in time for the derby against FK Partizan who was the leading club in the league.

Match
What was expected to be an equal match turned to become a demolition of Partizan from the guest side. At first, while the game was tied 0-0, Partizan had their chances but Hajduk managed to respond through counter-attacks. The game was dominated by Hajduk and with goals from Žungul and Buljan, the 1st half ended with only 2-1 for Hajduk. In the 2nd half, Hajduk became more attacking and managed to score 4 more goals from Jerković,Žungul and 2 from Đorđević.

Details

Aftermath
Despite defeating Partizan, Hajduk eventually failed to win the league after there was a scandal in the last round game when Partizan in need of a win to secure the title won against Olimpija scoring in the 95th minute of the game (even though UEFA didn't introduce additional time for another 20 years) thanks to referee Maksimović. Partizan was crowned champion at the end of the season and Tomislav Ivić decided to leave Hajduk so that he can manage AFC Ajax. Ivić would return again to Hajduk in 1978 and lead them to their last Yugoslav league title in the 1978–79 Yugoslav First League.

References 

1975–76 in Yugoslav football
Yugo
1976
1976